Sir Francis Drake ( 1540 – 28 January 1596) was an English explorer and privateer best known for his circumnavigation of the world in a single expedition between 1577 and 1580. This was the first English circumnavigation, and third circumnavigation overall. He is also known for participating in the early English slaving voyages of his cousin, Sir John Hawkins, and John Lovell. Having started as a simple seaman, in 1588 he was part of the fight against the Spanish Armada as a vice-admiral.

At an early age Drake was placed into the household of a relative, William Hawkins, a prominent sea captain in Plymouth. In 1572, he set sail on his first independent mission, privateering along the Spanish Main. Drake's circumnavigation began on 15 December 1577. He crossed the Pacific Ocean, until then an area of exclusive Spanish interest, and laid claim to New Albion, plundering coastal towns and ships for treasure and supplies as he went. He arrived back in England on 26 September 1580. Elizabeth I awarded Drake a knighthood in 1581 which he received aboard his galleon the Golden Hind.

Drake's circumnavigation inaugurated an era of conflict with the Spanish and in 1585, the Anglo-Spanish War began. Drake was in command of an expedition to the Americas that attacked Spanish shipping and ports. When Philip II sent the Spanish Armada to England in 1588 as a precursor to its invasion, Drake was second-in-command of the English fleet that fought against and repulsed the Spanish fleet. A year later he led the English Armada in a failed attempt to destroy the remaining Spanish fleet.

Drake was the Member of Parliament (MP) for three constituencies: Camelford in 1581, Bossiney in 1584, and Plymouth in 1593. Drake's exploits made him a hero to the English, but his privateering led the Spanish to brand him a pirate, known to them as El Draque ("The Dragon" in old Spanish). He died of dysentery after his failed assault on Panama in January 1596.

Birth and early years

Francis Drake was born at Crowndale Farm in Tavistock, Devon, England. His birth date is not formally recorded – such writers as E. F. Benson have claimed that he was born while the Six Articles of 1539 were in force, but British naval historian Julian Corbett, writing of William Camden's account, on which this information is based, writes that "As a slip of memory, too, we must put down his difficult assertion that Edmund Drake was driven from Devonshire during a persecution under the Six Articles Act of 1539." His birth date is estimated from the wording of texts in contemporary sources such as: "Drake was two and twenty when he obtained the command of the Judith" (1566). This would date his birth to 1544. A date of  1540 is suggested from two portraits: one a miniature painted by Nicholas Hilliard in 1581 when he was allegedly 42, which would place his birth c. 1539, while the other, painted in 1594 when he was said to be 52, would give a birth year of c. 1541.

He was the eldest of the twelve sons of Edmund Drake (1518–1585), a Protestant farmer, and his wife, Mary Mylwaye. The first son was alleged to have been named after his godfather, Francis Russell, 2nd Earl of Bedford.

Due to religious persecution during the Prayer Book Rebellion in 1549, the Drake family fled from Devon to Kent. There Drake's father obtained an appointment to minister to the men in the King's Navy. He was ordained deacon and was made vicar of Upnor Church on the Medway.

Early career at sea
At an early age Drake was placed into the household of a relative, sea-captain William Hawkins of Plymouth, and began his seagoing training as an apprentice on Hawkins' boats. By 18, he was a purser, according to the English chronicler Edmund Howes, and in the 1550s, Drake's father found the young man a position with the owner and master of a small barque, one of the small traders plying between the Medway River and the Dutch coast. Drake likely engaged in commerce along the coast of England, the Low Countries and France. The ship's master was so satisfied with the young Drake's conduct that, being unmarried and childless at his death, he bequeathed the barque to Drake.

Slave trade

Historical sources on Drake's early life are scarce, tend to be brief and are often confusing. Two common scholarly traditions concerning his life and contributions have resulted. The older tradition can be found in Julian Corbett's biography, Drake and the Tudor Navy (1898) which identifies Drake as the single most important figure in the founding and triumph of the British navy. The alternative approach locates Drake squarely within privateering. The first has tended to laud only his successes, while Sugden writes that the second approach, which emphasises his flaws and failures, has sometimes been less than just. Drake left behind no words of his own, only his actions and their interpretation which, as Peter Whitfield says, "is open to deep disagreement". According to Whitfield, scholarship on Drake has moved "from the hero worship of the Victorians to the cold iconoclasm" of the twenty-first century.

This is evident in the discussion of Drake's role in the slaving expeditions of his second cousin John Hawkins. The West African slave trade was at this time a Portuguese and Spanish duopoly, but Hawkins devised a plan to break into that trade, and in 1562, enlisted the aid of colleagues and family to finance his first slave voyage. Drake was not part of that group of financiers. Drake's presence as one of hundreds of seamen on Hawkins's first two slaving voyages has been assumed. There is some anecdotal evidence to support Drake serving as a common seaman on the first two voyages, and good evidence of his presence for the last two of four slaving voyages made by Hawkins' ships between 1562 and 1569.

In 1562, Hawkins sailed to the coast of the Sierra Leone, seized Portuguese slave ships, and sold the Africans in the Spanish Indies. It was highly profitable, so for his second slave voyage in 1564, Hawkins gained Queen Elizabeth I's support. She lent him one of her ships, Jesus of Lübeck, which served as his flagship. Hawkins attacked an African native town and sold many of its inhabitants in Spanish ports on the Caribbean mainland making another large profit for himself, the Queen and the consortium of investors from her court. Sources vary on the dates and the age of Drake at the time; Harry Kelsey says he was twenty years old, "[a]ccording to Howes" (in reference to the English chronicler Edmund Howes writing in 1615). Drake was not a member of that consortium, but the crew would have received a small share of the profits. Based on this association, scholar Kris Lane lists Drake as one of the first English slave traders.

The Spanish and Portuguese were aggrieved that the English had entered into the slave trade and were selling slaves to their colonies despite being forbidden from doing so. Queen Elizabeth I, under pressure to avoid an armed conflict, forbade Hawkins from going to sea for a third slave voyage. In response, he set up a slave voyage with a relative, John Lovell, in command in 1566. Drake accompanied Lovell on this voyage. The voyage was unsuccessful, as more than 90 enslaved Africans were released without payment.

In 1567, Drake accompanied Hawkins on their next and last joint voyage. The crew attempted to capture slaves around Cape Verde, but failed. Hawkins allied himself with two local kings in Sierra Leone who asked for help against their enemies in exchange for half of any captives they took. Attacking from both sides, several hundred prisoners were taken, though Kelsey says the kings kept "the larger share of slaves and dared Hawkins to do anything about it".

Events worsened for the fleet as it faced storms, Spanish hostility, armed conflict, and finally a hurricane that separated one ship from the rest, and it had to find its own way home. The remaining ships were forced into the port of San Juan de Ulúa near Vera Cruz so they could make repairs. Soon afterward the newly appointed viceroy of New Spain,  Martín Enríquez de Almanza, arrived with a fleet of ships. While still negotiating to resupply and repair, Hawkins' ships were attacked by the Spanish ships in what became known as the Battle of San Juan de Ulúa. The battle ended in an English defeat with all but two of the English ships lost. The Spanish launched a fireship against Hawkins' flagship Jesus of Lübeck, and the crew of Minion in panic and fear cut the lines securing them to Jesus. Hawkins was among those who jumped from the flagship's bulwarks to Minion'''s decks. Drake, by this time the captain of Judith, fled leaving Hawkins behind. Hawkins escaped on Minion and limped back to England with dozens of his men dying along the way, and arriving with a crew of just 15. Hundreds of English seamen were abandoned.

After arriving back in England, Hawkins accused Drake of desertion and of stealing the treasure they had accumulated. Drake denied both accusations asserting he had distributed all profits among the crew and that he had believed Hawkins was lost when he left. The bitter end of the fourth voyage turned Drake's life in a different direction: thereafter he would not pursue trading and slaving but would, instead, dedicate himself to attacking Spanish possessions wherever he found them. Drake's hostility towards the Spanish is said to have started with the battle and its aftermath.

The voyage of 1567–1569 was Drake's last association with slaving. In total, approximately 1,200 Africans were enslaved on his four voyages, and an estimated three times as many Africans were killed (based on the contemporaneous accounts of slavers). From the vantage of the 21st century Sugden writes that "Drake was in his twenties, and did not question what his elders accepted" and must share some culpability for his participation.

Expedition of 1572–1573

In 1572, Drake embarked on his first major independent enterprise. He planned an attack on the Isthmus of Panama, known to the Spanish as part of Tierra Firme and to the English as part of the Spanish Main. This was the point at which the silver and gold treasure of Peru had to be brought ashore and transported overland to the Caribbean Sea, where galleons from Spain would take it aboard at the town of Nombre de Dios. Drake left Plymouth on 24 May 1572, with a crew of 73 men in two small vessels, Pascha (70 tons) and Swan (25 tons), to capture Nombre de Dios.

Drake's first raid was late in July 1572. Drake captured Nombre de Dios, but he was badly wounded when the Spanish arrived from Panama, and his forces had to retreat without the gold, silver, pearls and jewels stored in the royal treasury. Rather than sacking Nombre de Dios again, Drake raided Spanish galleons along the coast and with his Cimarrón (enslaved Africans who had escaped from their Spanish slave-owners) allies looted the mule trains that transported gold, silver and trade goods from Panama City. One of these men was Diego, who later became a free man after years of service under Drake.

Among Drake's adventures along the Spanish Main, his capture of the Spanish silver train at Nombre de Dios on 1 April 1573 made him rich and famous. Near Cabo de Cativas he encountered a French privateer, Guillaume Le Testu, who was in command of the 80-ton warship Havre, and joined forces with him in a combined fleet. Drake had determined to intercept the mule train at the Campos River, two leagues from Nombre de Dios, and instructed the captains of his pinnaces to meet them at the Francisca River on 3 April to carry them off after the raid. The combined English and French raiding parties marched through the forest towards the trail, to within a mile of the city while the Cimarróns performed reconnaissance. The next morning, 1 April, they surprised the mule convoy and seized more than 200,000 pesos' worth of treasure.

After their attack on the richly laden mule train, Drake and his party found that they had captured around 20 tons of silver and gold. They buried much of the treasure, as it was too much for their party to carry, and made off with a fortune in gold. (An account of this may have given rise to subsequent stories of pirates and buried treasure). Badly wounded, Le Testu was captured and beheaded. When they got to the coast, the boats were gone. Drake and his men, downhearted, exhausted and hungry, had nowhere to go and the Spanish were not far behind.

At this point, Drake rallied his men, buried the treasure on the beach, and built a raft to sail in a heavy swell with four men twelve miles along the coast to where they had left two pinnaces. When Drake finally reached them, his men were alarmed at his bedraggled appearance. Fearing the worst, they asked him how the raid had gone. Drake could not resist a joke and teased them by looking downhearted. Then he laughed, pulled a quoit of Spanish gold from his clothes and said, "Our voyage is made." By the second week of August 1573, he had returned to Plymouth.

It was during this expedition that on 11 February Drake and his lieutenant John Oxenham climbed a high tree in the central mountains of the Isthmus of Panama and thus became the first Englishmen to see the Pacific Ocean, mirroring the achievement of the Spaniard Vasco Núñez de Balboa in 1513. The Cimarróns had cut steps into its trunk, on which Drake and the Cimarrón leader Pedro ascended to a platform at the top of the giant tree, where they were joined by Oxenham. The Englishmen vowed when they saw the Pacific Ocean that one day they would sail its waters – which Drake would do years later as part of his circumnavigation of the world.

When Drake returned to Plymouth after the raids, the government signed a temporary truce with King Philip II of Spain and so was unable to acknowledge Drake's accomplishment officially. Drake was considered a hero in England and a pirate in Spain for his raids.

Rathlin Island massacre
Drake was present at the 1575 Rathlin Island massacre in Ireland. Sir John Norris (or Norreys) and Drake, acting on the instructions of Sir Henry Sidney and the Earl of Essex, Robert Devereux, laid siege to Rathlin Castle. Despite its surrender, Norris' troops killed all the 200 defenders and several hundred more civilian men, women and children of Clan MacDonnell. Meanwhile, Drake was given the task of preventing any Gaelic Irish or Scottish reinforcements reaching the island. Therefore, the remaining leader of the Gaelic defence against English power, Sorley Boy MacDonnell, was forced to stay on the mainland. Essex wrote in his letter to Queen Elizabeth's secretary that following the attack Sorley Boy "was likely to have run mad for sorrow, tearing and tormenting himself and saying that he there lost all that he ever had."

Circumnavigation (1577–1580)

Following the success of the Panama isthmus raid, Drake's so-called "Famous Voyage" – an expedition against the Spanish along the Pacific coast of the Americas – was organized and financed by a private consortium that included Francis Walsingham, Robert Dudley, 1st Earl of Leicester, and the Hawkins brothers. Drake acted on the plan authored by Sir Richard Grenville, who in 1574 had received a royal patent for that purpose; just a year later this patent had been rescinded after Elizabeth I learned of Grenville's intentions against the Spanish. Elizabeth likely invested in Drake's voyage to South America in 1577, but never issued him a formal commission. This would be the first circumnavigation in 58 years.

Diego was once again employed under Drake; his fluency in Spanish and English would make him a useful interpreter when Spaniards or Spanish-speaking Portuguese were captured. He was employed as Drake's servant and was paid wages like the rest of the crew. Drake and the fleet set out from Plymouth on 15 November 1577, but bad weather threatened him and his fleet. They were forced to take refuge in Falmouth, Cornwall, from where they returned to Plymouth for repair.

After this major setback, Drake set sail again on 13 December aboard Pelican with four other ships and 164 men. He soon added a sixth ship, Mary (formerly Santa María), a Portuguese merchant ship that had been captured off the coast of Africa near the Cape Verde Islands. He also kidnapped its captain, Nuno da Silva, a man with considerable experience navigating in South American waters.

Drake's fleet suffered great attrition; he scuttled both Christopher and the flyboat Swan due to loss of men on the Atlantic crossing. He made landfall at the gloomy bay of Puerto San Julián, in what is now Argentina. Ferdinand Magellan had called here half a century earlier, where he put to death some mutineers. Drake's men saw weathered and bleached skeletons on the Spanish gibbets. Following Magellan's example, Drake tried and executed his own "mutineer" Thomas Doughty. The crew discovered that Mary had rotting timbers, so they put the vessel ashore, stripped it, and abandoned it. Drake decided to remain the winter in San Julián before attempting the Strait of Magellan.

Execution of Thomas Doughty

On his voyage to interfere with Spanish treasure fleets, Drake had several quarrels with his co-commander Thomas Doughty and on 3 June 1578, accused him of witchcraft and charged him with mutiny and treason in a shipboard trial. Drake claimed to have a (never presented) commission from the Queen to carry out such acts and denied Doughty a trial in England. The main pieces of evidence against Doughty were the testimony of the ship's carpenter, Edward Bright, who after the trial was promoted to master of the ship Marigold, and Doughty's admission of telling Lord Burghley, a vocal opponent of agitating the Spanish, of the intent of the voyage. Drake consented to his request of Communion and dined with him, of which Francis Fletcher had this account:

Drake had Thomas Doughty beheaded on 2 July 1578. When the ship's chaplain, Francis Fletcher, in a sermon suggested that the woes of the voyage in January 1580 were connected to the unjust demise of Doughty, Drake chained the clergyman to a hatch cover and pronounced him excommunicated.

Entering the Pacific (1578)

The three remaining ships of his convoy departed for the Magellan Strait at the southern tip of South America. A few weeks later in September 1578 Drake made it to the Pacific, but violent storms destroyed one of the three ships, Marigold (captained by John Thomas) in the strait and caused another, Elizabeth, captained by John Wynter, to return to England, leaving only Pelican. After this passage, Pelican was pushed south and discovered an island that Drake called Elizabeth Island. Drake, like navigators before him, probably reached a latitude of 55°S (according to astronomical data quoted in Richard Hakluyt's The Principall Navigations, Voiages and Discoveries of the English Nation of 1589) along the Chilean coast. In the Magellan Strait Francis and his men engaged in skirmishes with local indigenous people, becoming the first Europeans to kill indigenous peoples in southern Patagonia. During their stay in the strait, crew members discovered that an infusion made of the bark of Drimys winteri could be used as remedy against scurvy. Captain Wynter ordered the collection of great amounts of bark – hence the scientific name.

Historian Mateo Martinic, who examined records of Drake's travels, credits him with the discovery of the "southern end of the Americas and the oceanic space south of it". The first report of his discovery of an open channel south of Tierra del Fuego was written after the 1618 publication of the voyage of Willem Schouten and Jacob le Maire around Cape Horn in 1616.

Drake pushed onwards in his lone flagship, now renamed Golden Hind in honour of Sir Christopher Hatton (after his coat of arms). Golden Hind sailed north along the Pacific coast of South America, attacking Spanish ports and pillaging towns. Some Spanish ships were captured, and Drake used their more accurate charts. Before reaching the coast of Peru, Drake visited Mocha Island, where he was seriously injured by hostile Mapuche. Later he sacked the port of Valparaíso further north in Chile, where he also captured a ship full of Chilean wine.

Capture of Spanish treasure ships
Near Lima, Drake captured a Spanish ship with 25,000 pesos of Peruvian gold, amounting in value to 37,000 ducats of Spanish money (about £7m by modern standards). Drake also discovered news of another ship, Nuestra Señora de la Concepción, which was sailing west towards Manila. It would come to be called Cacafuego. Drake gave chase and eventually captured the treasure ship, which proved his most profitable capture.

Drake was naturally pleased at his good luck in capturing the galleon, and he showed it by dining with the captured ship's officers and gentleman passengers. He offloaded his captives a short time later, and gave each one gifts appropriate to their rank, as well as a letter of safe conduct.

Coast of California: Nova Albion (1579)

Prior to Drake's voyage, the western coast of North America had only been partially explored in 1542 by Juan Rodríguez Cabrillo who sailed for Spain. So, intending to avoid further conflict with Spain, Drake navigated north-west of Spanish presence and sought a discreet site at which the crew could prepare for the journey back to England.

On 5 June 1579, the ship briefly made first landfall at what is now South Cove, Cape Arago, just south of Coos Bay, Oregon, and then sailed southward. On 17 June, Drake and his crew found a protected cove when they landed on the Pacific coast of what is now Northern California. While ashore, he claimed the area for Queen Elizabeth I as Nova Albion or New Albion. To document and assert his claim, Drake posted an engraved plate of brass to claim sovereignty for Elizabeth and every successive English monarch. After erecting a fort and tents ashore, the crew laboured for several weeks as they prepared for the circumnavigating voyage ahead by careening their ship, Golden Hind, so to effectively clean and repair the hull. Drake had friendly interactions with the Coast Miwok and explored the surrounding land by foot. When his ship was ready for the return voyage, Drake and the crew left New Albion on 23 July and paused his journey the next day when anchoring his ship at the Farallon Islands where the crew hunted sea lions or seals.

Across the Pacific and around Africa
Drake left the Pacific coast, heading south-west to catch the winds that would carry his ship across the Pacific, and a few months later reached the Moluccas, a group of islands in the western Pacific, in eastern modern-day Indonesia. At this time Diego died from wounds he had sustained earlier in the voyage, Golden Hind later became caught on a reef and was almost lost. After the sailors waited three days for convenient tides and had dumped cargo. Befriending Sultan Babullah of Ternate in the Moluccas, Drake and his men became involved in some intrigues with the Portuguese there. He made multiple stops on his way toward the tip of Africa, eventually rounded the Cape of Good Hope, and reached Sierra Leone by 22 July 1580.

Return to Plymouth (1580)

On 26 September 1580, Golden Hind sailed into Plymouth with Drake and 59 remaining crew aboard, along with a rich cargo of spices and captured Spanish treasures. The queen's half-share of the cargo surpassed the rest of the crown's income for that entire year. Drake was hailed as the first Englishman to circumnavigate the Earth, and his was the second such voyage arriving with at least one ship intact, after Elcano's in 1520.

Queen Elizabeth declared that all written accounts of Drake's voyages were to become the queen's secrets of the Realm, and Drake and the other participants of his voyages on the pain of death sworn to their secrecy; she intended to keep Drake's activities hidden from the eyes of rival Spain.

Drake presented the queen with a jewel token commemorating the circumnavigation. Taken as a prize off the Pacific coast of Mexico, it was made of enamelled gold and bore an African diamond and a ship with an ebony hull.

To show her gratitude the queen gave him the Drake Jewel, a valuable pendant surrounded by diamonds, rubies and pearls. It was an unusual gift to bestow upon a commoner, and one that Drake wore in a 1591 portrait by Marcus Gheeraerts. On one side of the pendant is a state portrait of Elizabeth by the miniaturist Nicholas Hilliard, on the other a sardonyx cameo of double portrait busts, a regal woman and an African male. The Drake Jewel is a rare documented survivor among sixteenth-century jewels; it is conserved at the Victoria and Albert Museum, London.

Knighthood and arms
Queen Elizabeth awarded Drake a knighthood aboard Golden Hind in Deptford on 4 April 1581; the dubbing being performed by a French diplomat, Monsieur de Marchaumont, who was negotiating for Elizabeth to marry the King of France's brother, Francis, Duke of Anjou. By getting the French diplomat involved in the knighting, Elizabeth was gaining the implicit political support of the French for Drake's actions. During the Victorian era, in a spirit of nationalism, the story was promoted that Elizabeth I had done the knighting.

After receiving his knighthood Drake unilaterally adopted the coat of arms of the ancient Devon family of Drake of Ash, to whom he claimed a distant but unspecified kinship. The right to use the arms was disputed in court so Queen Elizabeth awarded Drake his own coat of arms.

Drake's heraldic achievement and coat of arms contains the motto, Sic Parvis Magna, which means: "Great achievements from small beginnings". A hand coming out of the clouds is labelled Auxilio Divino, which means "By divine aid".

Political career
Drake first became a member of parliament for the last session of the 4th Parliament of Elizabeth I, on 16 January 1581, for the constituency of Camelford. He did not actively participate at this point, and on 17 February 1581 he was granted leave of absence "for certain his necessary business in the service of Her Majesty".

Drake became the Mayor of Plymouth in September 1581. During his tenure, he installed a compass in the town's Hoe, and passed a law regulating the local pilchard trade. During his term as lord mayor, Drake contracted to construct a leat, or canal, to bring water from the River Meavy, and to build six new gristmills on it from which he derived a substantial profit.

Drake became a member of parliament again in 1584 for Bossiney, on the forming of the 5th Parliament of Elizabeth I. He served the duration of the parliament and was active in issues regarding the navy, fishing, early American colonisation, and issues related chiefly to Devon. He spent the time covered by the next two parliamentary terms engaged in other duties and an expedition to Portugal.

He became a member of parliament for Plymouth in 1593. He was active in issues of interest to Plymouth as a whole, but also to emphasise defence against the Spanish.

Great Expedition to America

War broke out between England and Spain in 1585, after the signing of the Treaty of Nonsuch. Queen Elizabeth I, through her principal secretary Francis Walsingham, ordered Sir Francis Drake to lead an expedition to attack the Spanish colonies in a kind of pre-emptive strike. An expedition left Plymouth in September 1585 with Drake in command of twenty-one ships with 1,800 soldiers under Christopher Carleill. He first attacked Vigo in Spain and held the place for two weeks ransoming supplies. He then plundered Santiago in the Cape Verde islands after which the fleet then sailed across the Atlantic, sacked the port of Santo Domingo, and captured the city of Cartagena de Indias in present-day Colombia. At Cartagena, Drake released one hundred Turks who were enslaved. On 6 June 1586, during the return leg of the voyage, he attacked the wooden Spanish fort at San Agustín in Spanish Florida and burnt the town to the ground.

After the raids he then went on to find Sir Walter Raleigh's settlement much further north at Roanoke which he replenished and also took back with him all of the original colonists before Sir Richard Grenville arrived with supplies and more colonists. He finally reached England on 22 July, when he sailed into Portsmouth, England to a hero's welcome.

Conflict with the Spanish Armada

In part to prevent future such attacks by English and Dutch privateers against Spanish interests in the Americas, Philip II ordered a planned invasion of England.

Cádiz raid

On 15 March 1587, Drake accepted a new commission with several purposes: to disrupt the shipping routes in order to slow supplies from Italy and Andalucia to Lisbon, to trouble enemy fleets that were in their own ports, and to capture Spanish ships laden with treasure. Drake was also to confront and attack the Spanish Armada had it already sailed for England. When arriving at Cadiz on 19 April, Drake found the harbour packed with ships and supplies as the Armada was readying and waiting for a fair wind to launch the fleet to attack. In the early hours of the next day, Drake pressed his attack into the inner harbour and inflicted heavy damage. Claims of the exact Spanish ship losses vary: Drake claimed he had sunk 39 ships, while the Spanish admitted the loss of only 24. The attack became known as the "singeing of the King's beard" and delayed the Spanish invasion by a year.

Over the next month, Drake patrolled the Iberian coasts between Lisbon and Cape St. Vincent, intercepting and destroying ships on the Spanish supply lines. Drake estimated that he had captured around 1,600 to 1,700 tons of barrel staves, enough to make  for containing provisions. The expedition resulted in a total profit for England of around £140,000, £18,235 of which went to Drake.

Defeat of the Spanish Armada

The Spanish Armada set sail for England in May of 1588, and arrived on the English coast on 29 July, near Cornwall. An English fleet consisting of 55 ships set out from Plymouth to confront the Armada, under the command of Lord Howard of Effingham, with Sir Francis Drake serving as vice admiral, commanding from the galleon Revenge. As the English fleet pursued the Armada up the English Channel in closing darkness, Drake broke off and captured the Spanish galleon Nuestra Señora del Rosario, along with Admiral Pedro de Valdés and all his crew. The Spanish ship was known to be carrying substantial funds to pay the Spanish Army in the Low Countries. Drake's ship had been leading the English pursuit of the Armada by means of a lantern. By extinguishing this for the capture, Drake put the fleet into disarray overnight.

On the night of 29 July, along with Howard, Drake organised fire ships, causing the majority of the Spanish captains to break formation and sail out of Calais into the open sea. The next day, Drake was present at the Battle of Gravelines. He wrote as follows to Admiral Henry Seymour after coming upon part of the Spanish Armada, whilst aboard Revenge on 31 July 1588 (21 July 1588 OS):

Coming up to them, there has passed some common shot between some of our fleet and some of them; and as far as we perceive, they are determined to sell their lives with blows.

The armada, having failed in their aim, were unable to sail back via the English channel. The English ships, including the Revenge, pursued to prevent any landing on English soil, although by this time most of Howard's ships were almost out of shot. Nevertheless the battered Spanish fleet were forced instead to sail around the British isles and encountered heavy storms off the coast of Ireland. The fleet eventually limped back to Spanish ports having lost overall some 63 ships and vessels.

The most famous (but probably apocryphal) anecdote about Drake relates that, prior to the battle, he was playing a game of bowls on Plymouth Hoe. On being warned of the approach of the Spanish fleet, Drake is said to have remarked that there was plenty of time to finish the game and still beat the Spaniards, perhaps because he was waiting for high tide. There is no known eyewitness account of this incident and the earliest retelling of it was printed 37 years later. Adverse winds and currents caused some delay in the launching of the English fleet as the Spanish drew nearer, perhaps prompting a popular myth of Drake's cavalier attitude to the Spanish threat.

English Armada

In 1589, the year after the failure of the Spanish Armada, the English sent their own armada to attack Spain. Drake and Norris were given three tasks. Firstly, to destroy the battered Spanish Atlantic fleet, which was being repaired in ports of northern Spain. Secondly, to make a landing at Lisbon, Portugal and raise a revolt there against King Philip II (Philip I of Portugal) installing the pretender Dom António, Prior of Crato to the Portuguese throne. And, thirdly, to take the Azores if possible so as to establish a permanent base.

In the siege of Coruña, Drake and Norris destroyed a few ships in the harbour of A Coruña in Spain but were repelled. This defeat in all fronts delayed Drake for two weeks, and he was forced to forgo hunting the rest of the surviving ships and head on to Lisbon.

Norris led his army on a difficult march over the rocky coast to Lisbon, while Drake sailed around the peninsula to join Essex with his heavy artillery. Norris's troops were sick and exhausted by the time they reached the western limits of the city, consequently he demanded that Dom António raise provisions and men to fight for his cause from amongst the local populace, or the army would retreat. Drake, against their agreed plans, had anchored his fleet in the mouth of the Tagus estuary, rather than running the risk of sailing past the well-defended stretches of the Tagus to bring the desperately needed heavy cannon and ordnance. The anticipated rebellion never materialised and the ground campaign was a total failure, so Norris, with his army and António, re-embarked to make an attempt at capturing the treasure fleet. The weather was not in their favour so they eventually sailed for home.

However, Drake wanted to atone for such a bitter setback and, in order not to return empty-handed and with the morale of his troops sunk, he made a fleeting stop in the Galician rías, or coastal inlets, pillaging the defenceless town of Vigo for two days and razing it to the ground. This abusive demonstration  did not leave the corsair unharmed, as he lost hundreds more men on land, in addition to as many as two hundred wounded. The growing defences of the inhabitants, and the arrivals of militias from Portugal, put the ships in retreat again. Two of the vessels sailing back to Plymouth were captured in the Bay of Biscay by a squadron of zabras led by Captain Diego de Aramburu.

The failure cost the lives of 11,000 English soldiers and sailors, according to Bucholz and Key; Robert Hutchinson says between 8,000 and 11,000 died; while Gorrochategui Santos calculates the number at over 20,000. Upon his return, Drake's behaviour in the expedition was increasingly called into question, culminating in his being charged by England's Privy Council of deliberate failings and a mishandling of his command. Despite never being publicly admonished on these charges, he nevertheless fell out of favour, and was not given command of another naval expedition until 1595.

Defeats and death

Drake's seafaring career continued into his mid-fifties. In 1595, he failed to conquer the port of Las Palmas, and following a disastrous campaign against Spanish America, where he suffered a number of defeats, he unsuccessfully attacked San Juan de Puerto Rico, and lost the Battle of San Juan. The Spanish gunners from El Morro Castle shot a cannonball through his stateroom on the expedition's flagship, but he survived.

He and his second-in-command, Thomas Baskerville, captured and burned Nombre de Dios, and started an overland crossing of the isthmus to attack the city of Panama, but were repulsed by the well-entrenched Spaniards who had barricaded the road; suffering heavy casualties, they gave up the attempt. A few weeks later, on 28 January 1596, Drake died (aged about 56) of dysentery, a common disease in the tropics at the time, while anchored off the coast of Portobelo where some Spanish treasure ships had sought shelter. Following his death, the English fleet withdrew defeated.

Before dying, he asked to be dressed in his full armour. He was buried at sea in a sealed lead-lined coffin, near Portobelo, a few miles off the coastline. It is supposed that his final resting place is near the wrecks of two British ships, Elizabeth and Delight, scuttled in Portobelo Bay. Efforts by researchers and treasure hunters to discover the location of his remains are ongoing, while divers continue to search the seabed for the coffin.

Family and heritage

Francis Drake married Mary Newman at St Budeaux church near Plymouth, on 4 July 1569. She died about 24 January 1583. In 1585, Drake married Elizabeth Sydenham, born around 1562, the only child of Sir George Sydenham, of Combe Sydenham, who was the High Sheriff of Somerset.

In 1580, Drake purchased Buckland Abbey, a large manor house near Yelverton, Devon, via intermediaries from Sir Richard Grenville. He lived there for fifteen years, until his final voyage, and it remained in his family until 1946. Buckland Abbey is now in the care of the National Trust and a number of mementos of his life are displayed there. His coat of arms and full achievement is depicted in the form of a large, coloured plaster overmantel in the Lifetimes Gallery at Buckland Abbey.

Drake was one of twelve children. His brother Thomas accompanied him on voyages, and named his son after him. That nephew eventually became Sir Francis Drake, 1st Baronet.

Legacy

There are various places in the United Kingdom named after him, especially in Plymouth, Devon. Places there carrying his name include Drake's Island, Drake Circus Shopping Centre, and the Royal Navy base HMNB Devonport (also known as "HMS Drake"). Plymouth Hoe is also home to a statue of Drake. The Sir Francis Drake Channel is located in the British Virgin Islands.

Various mountains in British Columbia were named in the 1930s for Drake, or in connection with Elizabeth I or other figures of that era, including Mount Sir Francis Drake, Mount Queen Bess, and the Golden Hinde, the highest mountain on Vancouver Island. Fringe theorists suggest he may also have landed to the north of the usual site considered to be Nova Albion – among them Canadian Samuel Bawlf, who claims that its true location was on Vancouver Island at latitude 50 degrees north.

Several landmarks in northern California were named after Drake, beginning in the late 19th century and continuing into the 20th century. American historian Richard White posits that the origins of these commemorations to nineteenth-century Anglo-Saxonism. Public scrutiny of these memorials intensified in 2020 after the protests drew critical attention to place names and monuments perceived to be connected to white supremacy, colonialism, or racial injustice. Several California landmarks that commemorated Drake were removed or renamed. Citing Drake's associations with the transatlantic slave trade, colonialism and piracy, Sir Francis Drake High School, in San Anselmo, California, changed its name to Archie Williams High School, after former teacher and Olympic athlete Archie Williams. A statue of Drake in Larkspur, California was also removed by the city authorities. Multiple jurisdictions in Marin County considered renaming Sir Francis Drake Boulevard, one of its major thoroughfares, but left the name intact when they failed to reach a consensus. In San Francisco, the Sir Francis Drake Hotel was renamed the Beacon Grand Hotel.

Drake's will was the focus of an extensive confidence scam which Oscar Hartzell perpetrated in the 1920s and 1930s.

Drake's Drum has become an icon of English folklore with its variation of the classic king asleep in mountain story motif.

Drake was a major focus in the video game series Uncharted, specifically its first and third instalments, Uncharted: Drake's Fortune and Uncharted 3: Drake's Deception, respectively. The series follows Nathan Drake, a self-proclaimed descendant of Drake who retraces his ancestor's voyages.

Drake was the subject of a TV series, Sir Francis Drake'' (1961–1962). Terence Morgan played Drake in the 26-episode adventure drama.

In Valparaíso, Chile, folklore associates a cave known as Cueva del Pirata (lit. "Cave of the Pirate") with Francis Drake. A legend says that when Drake ransacked the port, he was disappointed with the scant plunder, and proceeded to enter the churches in fury to sack them and urinate on the goblets. Supposedly he still found the plunder to be not worth enough to take on board his galleon, and hid it in the cave.

See also
 Francis William Drake – relative of Sir Francis Drake
 Drake's Leat – a water supply for Plymouth, promoted by Drake

References

Bibliography
 
 
 
 
 
 
 
 
 
 
 
 . Received a special citation from the Pulitzer Prize committee in 1960.

External links

 
1540s births
1596 deaths
16th-century explorers
16th-century Royal Navy personnel
English admirals
English MPs 1572–1583
English MPs 1584–1585
English MPs 1593
English people of the Anglo-Spanish War (1585–1604)
Burials at sea
Circumnavigators of the globe
English explorers
English knights
English explorers of North America
Explorers of California
Explorers of Oregon
Mayors of Plymouth
Military personnel from Tavistock
Deaths from dysentery
People who died at sea
English privateers
English male bowls players
Members of the Parliament of England for Plymouth
Knights Bachelor
English explorers of the Pacific
Massacres in Ireland
Members of the Inner Temple
Year of birth uncertain
Members of the Parliament of England for Bossiney
Members of the Parliament of England for Camelford